Belby is a hamlet in the East Riding of Yorkshire, England. It lies just to the south of the B1230 road and north of the M62 motorway.

Belby forms part of the civil parish of Kilpin.

References

External links

Villages in the East Riding of Yorkshire